But for Now Leave Me Alone (stylized in all caps) is the second studio album of American rapper pH-1. It was released on September 15, 2022 through H1ghr Music.

Background 
In an interview with Eyesmag, pH-1 explained the inspiration behind the album.
People often think of me as a 'bright', 'sweet', and 'soft' person. In this album, I wanted to reveal the dark side of me that was not seen by the public. I wanted to change my image too. Therefore, I changed the overall visuals to match the mood of the song.

Music and lyrics 
But for Now Leave Me Alone features songs with a touch of pop. "Zombies" has uptempo rhythm and smooth melody arrangement in the chorus while "Yuppie Ting" borrows from UK garage sound. On "Mr. Bad", pH-1 emphasizes the image of the attractive playboy with laid-back raps.

Lyricwise, pH-1 "flips through the anthology of his life, delineating his brush with failed relationship attempts, battling his inner demons, stardom’s double-edged sword and more."

Critical reception 

Hwang Du-ha of Rhythmer rated the album 3 out of 5 stars. According to him, the charm of But for Now Leave Me Alone is its sophisticated and elegant production. However, because of pH-1's monotonous rap performance, "the more you listen to it attentively, the more you lose interest in it."

Catherine Parker of Seoul Therapy rated the album 9 out of 10 points. According to her, it "encompasses pH-1’s music tastes by including genres and sounds that he listens to and loves, allowing him to showcase his skills as a singer, rapper, and above all, a storyteller."

Jang Jun-hwan of IZM rated "Mr. Bad" 3 out of 5 stars. According to him, it is a pre-release that "draws attention even without a definite impact." He concluded that pH-1 proves again that he is a "all-rounder" who can fit into any song.

Year-end lists

Track listing

Charts

References 

2022 albums
Hip hop albums by South Korean artists
House music albums by South Korean artists
Rhythm and blues albums by South Korean artists